Tim Higgins may refer to:
 Tim Higgins (ice hockey), Canadian hockey player
 Tim Higgins (journalist), American journalist and author